Rosspoint is an unincorporated community in Harlan County, Kentucky, United States. Its post office  is closed.

References

Unincorporated communities in Harlan County, Kentucky
Unincorporated communities in Kentucky